

Film 
In films, possessive may refer to:

 Possessive, a 2017 Indonesian drama film, (also known as Posesif).

Science 
In linguistics, a possessive is a word or construction that indicates possession or similar relationship.

See also:
 Possession (linguistics), for the relationships indicated by grammatical possessives
 Possessive case, a grammatical case used in possessive constructions in some languages
 Possessive determiner (or possessive adjective), a word modifying nouns in possessive constructions, such as my, their
 Possessive pronoun, a word used independently in possessive constructions, such as mine, theirs
 Possessive affix, a prefix or suffix used added to a word in some languages to indicate the possessor 
 English possessive, the above forms as found in the English language

For possessive behavior in human relationships, see Attachment in adults.

See also 
 Possession (disambiguation)
 Possessed (disambiguation)
 The Dispossessed, novel
 Dispossess